Pomaderris bodalla, commonly known as Bodalla pomaderris, is a species of flowering plant in the family Rhamnaceae and is endemic to New South Wales. It is a shrub with hairy young stems, elliptic to more or less rhombic leaves, and dense clusters of cream-coloured flowers.

Description
Flowering has been observed in October.

Taxonomy
Pomaderris bodalla was first formally described in 1997 by Neville Grant Walsh and Fiona Coates and the description was published in the journal Muelleria from specimens collected by Walsh near Tilba Tilba in 1995.

Distribution and habitat
Bodalla pomaderris grows in moist open forest near streams and in sheltered gullies between Bodalla and Merimbula on the south coast, and in open forest and woodland near Muswellbrook in the upper Hunter Valley in New South Wales.

Conservation status
This pomaderris is listed as "vulnerable" under the New South Wales Government Biodiversity Conservation Act 2016.

References

bodalla
Flora of Queensland
Flora of New South Wales
Plants described in 1997